Avary is a surname. Notable people with the surname include:

 Bryce Avary, see The Rocket Summer
 Myrta Lockett Avary (1857–1946), American white supremacist, author, and journalist
 Roger Avary (born 1965), Canadian-American producer, screenwriter, and director

See also
 Avery (surname)